The 6 April 2009 Baghdad bombings were six car bombings across the Iraqi capital of Baghdad, though it was not known if the attacks were a result of coordination and planning or merely coincidental.

Background
The attacks came a week after Iraqi forces putting down an uprising by members of an Awakening Council angry over the arrest of their commander.

Despite a seeming decline in violence since the 2003 invasion of Iraq, the capability of many armed groups to strike with deadly results still exists. Though the government insists it is only detaining those wanted for grave crimes, certain fighters – many of them former insurgents – see it as settling sectarian scores. To this end some 250 Iraqis were killed in violent attacks in the month of March.

Attack
The bombings in the Shia neighbourhood of Sadr City had at least 10 deaths and 60 other injuries. In the central Allawi district, another explosion killed four people and wounded 15 others. A car bomb targeted the convoy of a senior interior ministry official resulting in one civilian death and another policeman dead while four policemen were injured in a southeastern neighbourhood of New Baghdad. A vehicle explosion near a market in the district of Hussainiya resulted in two other deaths and 12 others wounded. Another car bomb near the Doura district, killed four people and injured 15 more.

Perpetrators
There was/were no claim/s of responsibility as yet.

Reaction
Interior ministry officials have declined to comment on whether the bombings were co-ordinated.

See also
List of bombings during the Iraq War

References 

2009 murders in Iraq
21st-century mass murder in Iraq
Baghdad
Mass murder in 2009
Baghdad
2000s in Baghdad
Violence against Shia Muslims in Iraq
2009
April 2009 events in Iraq